The Dexivates (Gaulish: Dexiuates) were a small Gallic tribe dwelling in the southern part of modern Vaucluse, near the present-day village of Cadenet, during the Iron Age and the Roman period.

Name 
The tribe is attested as Dexivatium (var. dexuia-) by Pliny in the 1st century AD.

The Gaulish ethnonym Dexiuates derives from the stem deksiu(o)- ('on the right, in the south, favourable'). A local goddess is also attested as Dexiua (Dea) or Dexsiua. The name Dexivates thus either means 'those who live in the south' (i.e. 'the Southerners'), or 'those of the goddess Dexiua' (i.e. 'Worshippers of Dexiua'), whose name could be translated as 'she who is on the right / in the south', whence 'the Favourable'.

Geography 
They dwelled north of the Salyes and Anatilii, east of the Cavares, south of the Vocontii and Albici, and west of the Reii. According to historian Guy Barruol, they were part of the Saluvian confederation.

Built in the 3rd–2nd century BC, the oppidum of Castellar de Cadenet (modern Cadenet) was probably the chief town of the Dexivates. The site was occupied until at least the 3rd century AD. The countryside was densely populated, with 38 rural sites identified from the Roman period.

Culture 
The Dexivates were influenced by Greek culture, as attested by a series of Gallo-Greek inscriptions referring to personal names, and the discovery of a large hoard of Massaliote coins at Castellar dated from the 3rd–2nd centuries BC.

Religion 
During the Roman period, the former oppidum of Castellar saw the creation of a shrine devoted to the goddess Dexiua, a local deity only found in the region and with a clear ethnic dimension. The sanctuary was probably frequented by the local inhabitants between the 1st century BC and the end of the 3rd century AD. Her name could suggest that she was a deity of (good) fortune, or else connected to a fecundity function which would be equivalent to the Roman cult of Bona Dea. Dexiua is venerated once with the Roman god Mars in relation to the gift of axes, in an inscription dated to the 3rd century AD. Some scholars have proposed to see the couple as the protectors of the local community, although others contend that the association appears to be indirect and rather prompted by the needs of the dedicant. 

Dexiua is also associated once with the Caudellenses, which was probably a collective designation for the local deities of Cadenet, or else for its inhabitants:

Two inscriptions dedicated to the native god Lanovalus were found near a mountain stream called Laval (≈ Lavar), whose name is related to the deity. Lanovalus has been interpreted as a healing god in the context of a water-related cult. His name literally means 'Full Prince' (i.e. 'All-Powerful'), stemming from the Gaulish root lano- ('full') attached to the word ualos ('ruler, prince'). An altar dedicated to Iuppiter Optimus Maximus is also known from the castle of Cadenet.

Several representations of a human foot engraved on stelae are known from Castellar and its vicinity. Two conflicting interpretations have been proposed: a votive function (e.g. a mark let by pilgrims, or the foot of a divinity), or, more likely, a funerary function, by comparing with similar sites from southern Gaul.

References

Primary sources

Bibliography 

 

 

Historical Celtic peoples
Gauls
Tribes of pre-Roman Gaul
History of Vaucluse